Mr. Brain is a Japanese television drama broadcast by TBS from 23 May to 11 July 2009.

Synopsis
Ryusuke Tsukumo is a quirky, yet brilliant neuroscientist working for the National Research Institute of Police Science. Wielding a unique perspective and psychology, Tsukumo tackles the nation's most baffling crimes and scandals, going head-to-head with the most brilliant and twisted criminal minds. But his eccentricities and poor social timing can also aggravate people and circumstances, further complicating matters.

Cast
Takuya Kimura as Ryusuke Tsukumo
Haruka Ayase as Kazune Yuri
Hiro Mizushima as Toranosuke Hayashida
Sei Hiraizumi as Junpei Funaki
Osamu Shitara as Junichi Kanda
Shigenori Yamazaki as Koichi Ochi
Shiho as Mariko
Yukina Kinoshita as the cleaning lady
Shunya Isaka as Katsumi Namikoshi
Yasufumi Hayashi as Kiyoshi Iwabuchi
Katsuya Kobayashi as Ippei Seta
Yuji Tanaka as Mitsuo Natsume
Tortoise Matsumoto as Jotaro Nanba
Mao Daichi as Miharu Sasa
Teruyuki Kagawa as Tomomi Tanbara

Ratings 
In the tables below, the blue numbers represent the lowest ratings and the red numbers represent the highest ratings.

External links
  

2009 Japanese television series debuts
2009 Japanese television series endings
Japanese drama television series
TBS Television (Japan) dramas